There are in June 2022 9,437 resident Australians in Japan.

Notable Australians in Japan
Richard Court, Australian ambassador to Japan
Che'Nelle, Malaysian Australian J-Pop singer
George "Joji" Miller, singer and former comedian
Shū Uchida, voice actress

See also

 Australian diaspora
 Australian rules football in Japan
 Australia–Japan relations

References

 
Japan
Ethnic groups in Japan
Immigration to Japan